The following are lists of animated films that were the most expensive to make.

Most expensive animated films
2007, 2008, 2009, 2010, 2011 and 2016 are the most represented years with three films each.

Pixar is the most represented studio with fourteen films. Shrek is the most represented franchise with three of its four main films on the list, followed by Cars with two of its three main films.

Traditional animation

Disney  is the most represented studio with 14 films on the list. Winnie the Pooh is the most represented franchise with four films on the list. 2002 is the most represented year with four films.

Stop-motion
The following films are all stop motion animated films that cost over $10 million to create. 2012 are the most represented years with 3 films each.

Laika is the most represented studio with 5 films. Wallace and Gromit is the most represented franchise with two films on the list.

Anime

Timeline of most expensive animated films

The following is a timeline of the most expensive animated films since 1937.

Timeline of most expensive computer–animated films

Timeline of most expensive traditionally animated films

Timeline of most expensive stop motion animated films
The following is a timeline of most expensive stop motion animated films of all time. Laika has hold the record the most with four.

See also
 List of highest-grossing animated films
 List of highest-grossing anime films
 List of highest-grossing openings for animated films
 List of most expensive films

Notes

References

Highest-grossing
Animated